The 2016 Lehigh Mountain Hawks football team represented Lehigh University in the 2016 NCAA Division I FCS football season. They were led by 11th-year head coach Andy Coen and played their home games at Goodman Stadium. They were a member of the Patriot League. They finished the season 9–3, 6–0 in Patriot League play to be crowned Patriot League champions. They earned the League's automatic bid into the FCS playoffs where they lost in the first round to New Hampshire.

Schedule

Source: Schedule

Roster

Game summaries

Monmouth

at Villanova

at Penn

Princeton

at Yale

Colgate

at Georgetown

at Holy Cross

Fordham

Bucknell

at Lafayette

FCS Playoffs

First Round–New Hampshire

Ranking movements

References

Lehigh
Lehigh Mountain Hawks football seasons
Patriot League football champion seasons
Lehigh
Lehigh Mountain Hawks football